Yong Qi or Yongqi may refer to:

 Yongqi, Prince Rong (永琪), a Manchu prince of the Qing dynasty
 Yongqi (1752–1776) (永璂), a Manchu prince of the Qing dynasty
 Courage (Fish Leong album), Chinese title Yongqi (勇气), an album by Malaysian singer Fish Leong